Kamenice or Kamenicë may refer to:

Municipalities and settlements

Albania
Kamenicë, Korçë, a settlement in the Korçë Municipality, Korçë County
 , a settlement in the Divjakë Municipality, Fier County

Bosnia and Herzegovina
Kamenice (Breza), a settlement in the municipality of Breza
Kamenice (Jajce), a settlement in the municipality of Jajce

Czech Republic
Kamenice (Jihlava District), a market town in the Vysočina Region 
Kamenice (Prague-East District), a municipality and village in the Central Bohemian Region
Česká Kamenice, a town in the Ústí nad Labem Region
Kamenice nad Lipou, a town in the Vysočina Region 
Pustá Kamenice, a municipality and village in the Pardubice Region 
Srbská Kamenice, a municipality and village in the Ústí nad Labem Region
Trhová Kamenice, a market town in the Pardubice Region

Rivers
Kamenice (Elbe), tributary of the Elbe river
Kamenice (Jizera), tributary of the Jizera river
Kamenice (Nežárka), tributary of the Nežárka river

See also
Kamenica (disambiguation)
Chemnitz